FRHI Hotels & Resorts (previously known as Fairmont Raffles Hotels International) is a global hotel management company that is based in Toronto, Ontario, Canada. FRHI is the parent company that manages three brands of hotels: Fairmont, Raffles and Swissôtel. These hotel chains collectively include more than 100 hotels and resorts in over 30 countries worldwide. Since 2016, the company has been owned by AccorHotels, a French multinational hotel firm.

History
FRHI was formed in January 2006, when Colony Capital and Kingdom Holding Company entered into a joint venture. Through that partnership, the two groups acquired Fairmont Hotels and Resorts and combined Fairmont's business with Colony Capital's Raffles Hotels International, which was the parent of the Raffles and Swissôtel brands.

The company also owned Delta Hotels at one point, but it sold that hotel management company in October 2007 to bcIMC, a Crown corporation owned by the Government of British Columbia. In 2015, Delta Hotels was purchased by Marriott International.

Voyager Partners, a Qatari Diar affiliate, subsequently acquired a majority interest in FRHI in April 2010. In December 2015, AccorHotels announced that it would be purchasing FRHI in a US$2.9 billion deal, which was completed in 2016.

Previous history of Raffles Hotels

Established in 1989 to oversee the restoration of the historic Raffles Hotel in Singapore and the restructuring of Raffles City, the Raffles hotel company reopened its flagship hotel on September 16, 1991.

The company purchased the Swissôtel chain in 2001, and it took over the then Westin Stamford and Westin Plaza (both in Singapore) as the contract expired at the end of the year. On January 1, 2002, the two hotels were renamed as Swissôtel The Stamford and Raffles The Plaza (now Fairmont Singapore) respectively, with a refurbished look.

Former owner Raffles Holdings announced the sale of the chain on July 18, 2005, to Colony Capital from October 1, 2005. The sale included its 41 hotels and resorts, and its hotels under development. This included the landmark Raffles Hotel in Singapore, which is on a 100-year lease to Colony Capital. However, Raffles City was owned by Raffles Holdings under Tincel Properties Pte Ltd when it was sold, but it was eventually sold to CapitaCommercial Trust and CapitaMall Trust in July 2006.

References

External links

 

2016 mergers and acquisitions
Accor
Canadian companies established in 2006
Canadian subsidiaries of foreign companies
Companies based in Toronto
Hotel and leisure companies of Canada
Multinational companies headquartered in Canada